Vlădești is a commune in Galați County, Western Moldavia, Romania with a population of 2,211 people. It is composed of two villages, Brănești and Vlădești.

References

Communes in Galați County
Localities in Western Moldavia
Populated places on the Prut